Chhanda Gayen (9 July 1979 – 20 May 2014) was an Indian mountaineer, martial artist, explorer, and teacher of self-defense. She is best known for being the first, and fastest,  Indian to climb two eight-thousanders, Mount Everest and Mount Lhotse, in one go, which she did on 18 May 2013. She completed the traverse from the summit of Mount Everest to the summit of Mount Lhotse in 22 hours. 

She was awarded "Sera Avishkar" in Sera Bengali 2013 from ABP Ananda.

2014 avalanche

On 20 May 2014, she went missing along with two sherpas in an avalanche while descending the western side of Mount Kanchenjunga in Nepal. All three of them were later declared to have died in the avalanche.

See also
Indian summiters of Mount Everest - Year wise
List of Mount Everest summiters by number of times to the summit
List of Mount Everest records of India
List of Mount Everest records

References

1979 births
Bengali sportspeople
Sportspeople from Kolkata
Indian female mountain climbers
Indian mountain climbers
Indian summiters of Mount Everest
2014 deaths
Sportswomen from Kolkata
21st-century Indian women
21st-century Indian people
20th-century Indian women
20th-century Indian people
Mountain climbers from West Bengal
Mountaineering deaths
People from Howrah